The Aristocrat Motor Inn is a historic hotel building at 240 Central Avenue in Hot Springs, Arkansas.  It is a large seven-story structure, with a six-story U-shaped tower set on a basically rectangular ground floor.  It is finished in glass, brick, and metal, in the Mid-Century Modern style.  The tower is organized around a central courtyard, with the interior facades in a sawtooth pattern to maximize light coming into the hotel rooms facing inward.  The hotel was built in 1963 by Samuel Kirsch, a local businessman engaged in a variety of pursuits.  It was one of the first hotels built along the city's Central Avenue to feature a Modernist exterior.  It was operated as a hotel until 1978, and was after converted into low-income housing.

The property was listed on the National Register of Historic Places in 2017.

See also
National Register of Historic Places listings in Garland County, Arkansas

References

Hotel buildings on the National Register of Historic Places in Arkansas
Buildings and structures in Hot Springs, Arkansas
National Register of Historic Places in Hot Springs, Arkansas
1963 establishments in Arkansas
1978 disestablishments in Arkansas
Historic district contributing properties in Arkansas